Alberto Maximo Zozaya (13 April 1908 – 17 February 1981) was an Argentine football striker who played most of his career for Estudiantes de La Plata and represented the Argentina national team.

Playing career
Alberto "Don Padilla" Zozaya started his career in the early 1930s with Estudiantes. He was the first player to score a goal in the professional era of Argentine football, which began in 1931.

Zozaya became an integral part of the Estudiantes team of the 1930s nicknamed "Los Profesores" (The Professors). In 1931 he scored 33 goals in the league to become the top scorer in the Primera División Argentina and the whole of South America.

In 1937 Zozaya played in the South American Championship 1937 helping Argentina to win the title with a contribution of 5 goals.

In 1939 Zozaya moved to Racing Club de Avellaneda but he only played 2 games before moving to Bella Vista in Uruguay but he did not settle there either and retired at the end of the 1940 season.

Titles as a player

Managerial career
After retiring as a player Zozaya went into management, he was manager of Portuguese side Benfica from 1952 to 1953. He was also manager of Gimnasia de La Plata.

References

1908 births
1981 deaths
Sportspeople from Entre Ríos Province
Argentine footballers
Argentina international footballers
Association football forwards
Argentine Primera División players
Estudiantes de La Plata footballers
Racing Club de Avellaneda footballers
C.A. Bella Vista players
Argentine expatriate footballers
Expatriate footballers in Uruguay
Argentine football managers
Estudiantes de La Plata managers
S.L. Benfica managers
Club de Gimnasia y Esgrima La Plata managers
Expatriate football managers in Portugal
Copa América-winning players